Q-Be is a digital audio player manufactured in South Korea. It is imported in the United Kingdom and sold in many of the large electronic stores such as Currys. It has an Organic light-emitting diode display.  It is available in 256Mb, 512Mb and 1Gb memory variants. Its built-in battery is recharged using the same USB cable that is used to transfer data to the device, the cable is inserted into the headphone socket. The Q-Be is identical to the MobiBLU DAH-1500i.

See also
 Cube2

References

Digital audio players